Environmental Chemistry is a peer-reviewed scientific journal published by CSIRO Publishing. It covers all aspects of environmental chemistry, including atmospheric chemistry, (bio)geochemistry, climate change, marine chemistry, water chemistry, polar chemistry, fire chemistry, astrochemistry, earth and geochemistry, soil and sediment chemistry, and chemical toxicology. The editor-in-chief is Jamie Lead (University of South Carolina).

Abstracting and indexing
The journal is abstracted and indexed in:
Biological Abstracts
BIOSIS Previews
CAB Abstracts
Chemical Abstracts Service
Current Contents/Agriculture, Biology & Environmental Sciences
Current Contents/Physical Chemical & Earth Sciences
Science Citation Index Expanded
Scopus
According to the Journal Citation Reports, the journal has a 2017 impact factor of 2.923.

See also
Australian Journal of Chemistry
List of scientific journals in chemistry

References

Geochemistry journals
CSIRO Publishing academic journals
English-language journals
Environmental chemistry
Publications established in 2004